This is a list of electoral results for the electoral district of Springwood in Queensland state elections.

Members for Springwood

Election results

Elections in the 2020s

Elections in the 2010s

Elections in the 2000s

Elections in the 1990s

Elections in the 1980s

References

Queensland state electoral results by district